John Means is a former community college English instructor from Mason City, Illinois, who had gained fame in the 1980s as a stand-up comedian. Based out of San Francisco, he performed under the stage name "Dr. Gonzo." His act was a combination of standard observational humor and humorous songs, self-accompanied on electric guitar.

The songs were generally parodies of popular tunes of the day; however, in contrast to contemporary musical parodists such as "Weird Al" Yankovic, whose songs are performed comically, Means' musical accompaniments were largely faithful to the original artists'. His musical sensibilities caught the attention of some of the popular musicians of the day, and he was soon performing on the same bills as Stevie Ray Vaughan, Los Lobos, and other straight musical acts.

In 1981, he came in fifth on the Showtime cable channel competition, The Big Laff Off. In 1987, he was a contestant on Star Search.

His most successful collaboration was with famed 80s rock group, Huey Lewis and the News. He performed in several of their popular music videos, and traveled with them as the warm-up act on their 1984-1985 world tour. "Dr. Gonzo" can be seen on DVD on the 2 disc Back to the Future set in a special music video made for the movie, featuring "Doc Brown" Christopher Lloyd. By the mid-1980s, he was one of the most successful local acts in the San Francisco area. In 1989, he joined 45 other performers, including Los Lobos, Santana, Aaron Neville, and Crosby, Stills & Nash at a benefit concert in Watsonville, California for victims of the Loma Prieta earthquake. In 1991, he opened for Joe Walsh.

By the early 1990s, the stand-up craze that had fueled the success of "Dr. Gonzo" had started to subside. He retired from performing in 1992 and moved back to Mason City, where he took a position as an English professor at a nearby college and served on the city council. In 2002, he opened two restaurants in Mason City with his wife Peggy. An Italian pizza and pasta house named "PJ's" and a steakhouse named "Jack & Jo's" after his parents. He devotes his spare time to beautification projects in his hometown.

References

External links

American male comedians
Comedians from Illinois
Living people
People from Mason City, Illinois
Year of birth missing (living people)